Nikos Loverdos (Greek: Νίκος Λοβέρδος) was an Ottoman racing cyclist from the Greek community in Smyrna.  He competed as a Greek at the 1896 Summer Olympics in Athens. Loverdos competed in the 12 hours race, but did not finish.

References

External links

Cyclists at the 1896 Summer Olympics
19th-century sportsmen
Olympic cyclists of Greece
Smyrniote Greeks
Cyclists from the Ottoman Empire
Year of death missing
Greeks from the Ottoman Empire
Year of birth missing
Place of birth missing
Place of death missing
Sportspeople from İzmir